Dagestan or Daghestan may refer to:
Republic of Dagestan, a federal subject of Russia
Dagestan Autonomous Soviet Socialist Republic (1921–1993), an administrative division of the Russian SFSR, Soviet Union
Dagestan Oblast (1860-1917), province of the Russian Empire
Safavid Daghestan, a province of the Safavid Empire of Iran
2297 Daghestan, asteroid
Dagestan, a Gepard-class frigate laid down in 1994 and currently active in the Russian Caspian Sea fleet.